In computer science, a dispatch table is a table of pointers or memory addresses to functions or methods.  Use of such a table is a common technique when implementing late binding in object-oriented programming.

Perl implementation 
The following shows one way to implement a dispatch table in Perl, using a hash to store references to code (also known as function pointers).

# Define the table using one anonymous code-ref and one named code-ref
my %dispatch = (
    "-h" => sub {  return "hello\n"; },
    "-g" => \&say_goodbye
);
 
sub say_goodbye {
    return "goodbye\n";
}
 
# Fetch the code ref from the table, and invoke it
my $sub = $dispatch{$ARGV[0]};
print $sub ? $sub->() : "unknown argument\n";

Running this Perl program as perl greet -h will produce "hello", and running it as perl greet -g will produce "goodbye".

JavaScript implementation 
Following is a demo of implementing dispatch table in JavaScript:
var thingsWeCanDo = {
    doThisThing      : function() { /* behavior */ },
    doThatThing      : function() { /* behavior */ },
    doThisOtherThing : function() { /* behavior */ },
    default          : function() { /* behavior */ }
};

var doSomething = function(doWhat) {
    var thingToDo = thingsWeCanDo.hasOwnProperty(doWhat) ? doWhat : "default"
    thingsWeCanDo[thingToDo]();
}

Virtual method tables 

In object-oriented programming languages that support virtual methods, the compiler will automatically create a dispatch table for each object of a class containing virtual methods. This table is called a virtual method table or vtable, and every call to a virtual method is dispatched through the vtable.

See also 
 Branch table

References 

 Diomidis Spinellis (2003). Code Reading: The Open Source Perspective. Boston, MA: Addison-Wesley. 

Method (computer programming)
Articles with example Perl code